Charles Roger Eason, Jr. (July 31, 1918 – April 28, 1998) was a guard in the National Football League.

Biography
Eason was born on July 31, 1918 in Pauls Valley, Oklahoma.

Career
Eason was drafted in the third round of the 1942 NFL Draft by the Cleveland Rams and played four seasons with the team, including when the team made the move to Los Angeles, California. During his final season, he played with the Green Bay Packers.

He played at the collegiate level at the University of Oklahoma.

See also
List of Green Bay Packers players

References

External links

1918 births
1998 deaths
People from Pauls Valley, Oklahoma
Cleveland Rams players
Los Angeles Rams players
Green Bay Packers players
American football offensive guards
Oklahoma Sooners football players